Tony Cupito is an Independent American drummer from Orange County, California. He's played for alternative rock band Beware of Darkness and The Nervous Wreckords, which included Brian Karscig.

References

External links
 Tony Cupito as member of The Nervous Wreckords

Year of birth missing (living people)
American drummers
Living people
Musicians from Orange County, California
Place of birth missing (living people)